The Organon is the name given by Aristotle’s followers to his works on logic.

Organon may also refer to:
 Organon,  a system of principles by Immanuel Kant, whereby knowledge may be established
 The Organon of the Healing Art, title of Samuel Hahnemann’s 1810 book on homeopathy
 Organon International, a former Dutch pharmaceutical company
 Organon & Co., an American pharmaceutical company spun off from Merck & CO.
 Organon model, a model of communication formulated by Karl Bühler

See also
 Organum, a type of medieval polyphony
Orgonon, the home, laboratory and research center of the Austrian psychiatrist Wilhelm Reich